The Victor Valley College Solar Farm is a 1.26 MWp (1.02 MWAC) concentrator photovoltaics (CPV) power station in Victorville, California.

Upon completion in May 2010 it was the largest CPV project installed in North America.

It was built by Sachs Electric using 122 dual-axis SF-1100S systems, each of which contains 28 SF-1100 modules.  

Each module contains reflective optics to concentrate sunlight 650 times onto multi-junction solar cells, allowing a greater efficiency than other photovoltaic power plants.

The farm was constructed under California Solar Initiative (CSI) incentives and the projected annual output of 2.3 GW·h partially satisfies electricity consumption at the college.

Electricity production

See also

 Crafton Hills College Solar Farm
 Alamosa Solar Generating Project
 Solar power in California
 Renewable energy in the United States
 Renewable portfolio standard

References

External links
 VIDEO: 1 Megawatt Solar CPV Plant at Victor Valley College
 VIDEO: SolFocus CPV Story
 Analysis of Energy Production at a 1 MW CPV Site in Southern California
 Analysis Of Soiling Rates At The Victor Valley Community College CPV Site
 Experience from Reliability Field Trails

Photovoltaic power stations in the United States
Solar power stations in California
Victorville, California